Real Pool, known in Japan as , and in Europe as International Cue Club, is a video game developed by Astroll for the PlayStation 2. This is a retooling of a Microsoft Windows and Mac OS game, also called Real Pool, which was published by WizardWorks in August 1998.

A sequel to the game, called Real Pool 2, was released for Windows in 2002.

Reception

The game received "mixed" reviews according to the review aggregation website Metacritic. Mike Wolf of Next Generation said of the game, "The uninspired play control and average game modes make this one pool game to avoid." In Japan, Famitsu gave it a score of 26 out of 40.

References

External links
 

1998 video games
2000 video games
Classic Mac OS games
Cue sports video games
GT Interactive games
Infogrames games
Multiplayer and single-player video games
PlayStation 2 games
Takara video games
Video games developed in Japan
Video games developed in the United States
Windows games